Jewish Responses to Persecution is a book series that reprints and analyzes primary source texts by Jews to understand the Jewish response to persecution by Nazi Germany between 1933 and 1946. It was sponsored by the United States Holocaust Memorial Museum.

Works

References

History books about the Holocaust
Primary source collections